An anal retentive person is a person who pays such attention to detail that it becomes an obsession and may be an annoyance to others. The term derives from Freudian psychoanalysis.

Origins
In Freudian psychology, the anal stage is said to follow the oral stage of infant or early-childhood development. This is a time when an infant's attention moves from oral stimulation to anal stimulation (usually the bowels but occasionally the bladder), usually synchronous with learning to control its excretory functions—in other words, any form of child training and not specifically linked to toilet training.  Freud posited that children who experience conflicts, in which libido energy is under-indulged during this period of time, and the child is perhaps too strongly chastised for toilet-training accidents, may develop "anal retentive" fixations or personality traits.  These traits are associated with a child's efforts at excretory control: orderliness, stubbornness, and compulsions for control.  Conversely, those who are overindulged during this period may develop "anal-expulsive" personality types.

Influence and refutation
Freud's theories on early childhood have been influential on the psychological community; the phrase anal retentive and the term anal survive in common usage. The second edition of the Diagnostic and Statistical Manual (DSM-II) introduced obsessive-compulsive personality disorder (OCPD), with a definition based on Freud's description of anal-retentive personality. But the association between OCPD and toilet training is largely regarded as unsupported "pop-psychology" and therefore discredited by the majority of psychologists of the late 20th and early 21st centuries. There is no conclusive research linking anal stage conflicts with "anal" personality types.

See also
Encopresis
Psychosexual development

References

Freudian psychology
Psychoanalytic terminology
Toilet training

de:Fixierung_(Psychoanalyse)#Fixierung_der_analen_Phase